Donato Toma (born 4 December 1957) is an Italian politician and current president of Molise.

Biography 
Toma graduated in Economy at the University of Naples Federico II and became a business consultant, teaching also at the University of Molise. He served as an officer in the Carabinieri with the rank of Lieutenant.

After having been Assessor for Budget in Campobasso and in Bojano, at the 2018 regional elections, Toma has been elected President of Molise, supported by Forza Italia, the Northern League, Brothers of Italy and Us with Italy.

References 

1957 births
Living people
Politicians from Naples
Forza Italia (2013) politicians
21st-century Italian politicians
University of Naples Federico II alumni
Presidents of Molise